KIEM-TV (channel 3) is a television station in Eureka, California, United States, affiliated with NBC. It is owned by Imagicomm Communications alongside low-power CBS affiliate KVIQ-LD (channel 14). Both stations share studios on South Broadway in Spruce Point near the southwestern corner of Eureka, while KIEM-TV's transmitter is located along Kneeland Road southeast of the city.

History
KIEM-TV signed on the air as Eureka's first television station on October 25, 1953. The station was started by William B. Smullin and his company, California Oregon Broadcasting, Inc., who also started (and still owns) KOBI-TV in Medford, Oregon. The station call sign KIEM-TV was a counterpart to the company's AM radio station, KIEM — which stood for "Keep Informed Every Minute". The FM part of a broadcast trio was KRED. (Soon after KIEM-TV began broadcasting, the first stereo broadcast in Humboldt County used the AM station to broadcast the right channel and the FM station to broadcast the left channel.)

KIEM-TV was initially affiliated with CBS; however, as the only station in the market in its early years, it also provided programs from NBC, ABC, and DuMont (which folded in 1955). After KVIQ signed on in 1958 and became the NBC affiliate, both stations offered some ABC programming on a part-time basis. Full-time NBC coverage was provided by San Francisco's then-NBC affiliate KRON on area cable systems.

As NBC became the number 1 rated network in the mid-1980s, both KVIQ and KIEM increased the amount of programming aired from the work. At the same time, there were proposals for KREQ-TV (channel 23, now KAEF-TV) to launch as a new station in the Eureka market. In 1985, KIEM signed an exclusive affiliation contract with NBC, and KVIQ affiliated with CBS, while both carried ABC programming on a secondary basis until KREQ signed on. KIEM's NBC affiliation commenced on December 30. Another commercial station, KREQ-TV, signed on the air in 1987 as a Fox affiliate. When channel 23 became an ABC affiliate two years later, both KVIQ and KIEM ceased offering ABC programs on a part-time basis.

Pollack/Belz Broadcasting, who purchased the station in 1996, agreed to sell KIEM-TV to Lost Coast Broadcasting on March 13, 2017. Lost Coast, in turn, assigned its right to acquire the station to Redwood Television Partners, a subsidiary of Northwest Broadcasting, on August 15. Northwest would at that time sell its existing Eureka station, KVIQ. The sale was completed on December 1. 

In February 2019, Reuters reported that Apollo Global Management had agreed to acquire the entirety of Brian Brady's television portfolio, which it intends to merge with Cox Media Group (which Apollo is acquiring at the same time) and stations spun off from Nexstar Media Group's purchase of Tribune Broadcasting, once the purchases are approved by the FCC. In March 2019 filings with the FCC, Apollo confirmed that its newly formed broadcasting group, Terrier Media, would acquire Northwest Broadcasting, with Brian Brady holding an unspecified minority interest in Terrier. In June 2019, it was announced that Terrier Media would instead operate as Cox Media Group, as Apollo had reached a deal to also acquire Cox's radio and advertising businesses. The transaction was completed on December 17.

On March 29, 2022, Cox Media Group announced it would sell KIEM-TV, KVIQ-LD and 16 other stations to Imagicomm Communications, an affiliate of the parent company of the INSP cable channel, for $488 million; the sale was completed on August 1.

Sign-off

As of November 2013, KIEM signed off every Sunday morning at 1:00 a.m., and Monday morning at 12:35 a.m., and resumes broadcast at 5:00 a.m. During sign-off and sign-on, KIEM broadcast a classic sequence, which includes the old blue "3" logo with the NBC peacock logo and the station ID, which is licensed to the city. These were shown before and after the test pattern with SMPTE color bars and the News Channel 3 logo with the current gold "3" and NBC peacock logo with the station ID. This was its current digital ID as KIEM-DT, with the call letters used until the US Digital Transition in 2009 and its slogan as "The Spirit of the North Coast" on the bottom of the pattern. KIEM did not play the national anthem at sign-off or sign-on.
As of April 2020, they are now 24/7, running infomercials and similar programming during late night hours on weekends.

News operation
KIEM produces a total of 13½ hours of local news each week, with 2½ hours each weekday and one hour on Saturdays and Sundays. Following an hour-long newscast at 6 a.m., the station provides brief news updates during the Today Show. KIEM is currently the only station within the Eureka market to provide newscasts on weekend evenings, as competitors KAEF and KBVU only broadcast weekday newscasts. In addition, the weeknight newscasts are simulcast on KVIQ-LD while the morning and weekend newscasts are only seen on KIEM. KIEM may also provide breaking news coverage for floods or other emergency coverage when warranted.

In 2017, KIEM introduced a major update to their graphics with HD capabilities.

In early 2022, John Kennedy O'Connor joined the station as the lead news anchor.

Notable former on-air staff
 Marc Brown – (1984; now at KABC-TV in Los Angeles)

Technical information

Subchannels
The station's digital signal is multiplexed:

Analog-to-digital conversion
KIEM-TV shut down its analog signal, over VHF channel 3, on June 12, 2009, the official date in which full-power television stations in the United States transitioned from analog to digital broadcasts under federal mandate. The station's digital signal relocated from its pre-transition UHF channel 16 to VHF channel 3 for post-transition operations.

Translators

Satellite availability
The Eureka television market, one of the smallest in the country, was the only TV market in California not available on Dish Network until June 3, 2010, at which time it became available. Since November 2, 2011, KIEM has also been available on DirecTV.

References

External links
Official website

NBC network affiliates
Ion Television affiliates
IEM-TV
Television channels and stations established in 1953
1953 establishments in California
Imagicomm Communications
2022 mergers and acquisitions